The 2020 Chicago Sky season was the franchise's 15th season in the Women's National Basketball Association (WNBA). This was the second season under head coach James Wade. The Sky did not improve on their previous season's record of 20–14, but entered the playoffs for the second consecutive season.

The season was initially scheduled to feature an all-time high 36 regular-season games, tipping off at the Sky's home Wintrust Arena on May 15, 2020. However, this plan was halted on April 3, when the WNBA postponed its season due to the COVID-19 pandemic. Under a plan approved on June 15, the league has been holding a shortened 22-game regular season at IMG Academy, without fans present, since July 24. Under this plan, the Sky's first game was on July 26, versus the Las Vegas Aces.

The Sky started out the season with success, posting a 10–4 record through 14 games. However, they lost 6 of their last 8 games to finish the season with a 12–10 record. They entered the playoffs as the 6th seed, losing to the 7th-seeded Connecticut Sun. In the offseason, the team added Azurá Stevens and Sydney Colson while losing Katie Lou Samuelson. During the season, they traded away Jantel Lavender and acquired Stephanie Mavunga. They also experienced a number of injuries throughout the season, ending the season without key players including Stevens and Diamond DeShields.

Starting guard Courtney Vandersloot set the all-time WNBA record for assists per game with 10, breaking her own record of 9.1 set in the 2019 season.

Transactions

WNBA Draft 
The Sky will make the following selections in the 2020 WNBA Draft.

Trades and Roster Changes

Roster

Season overview 
The Sky entered the 2020 season looking to build on dramatic improvements in the previous season, when they reached the playoffs for the first time in three years and were recognized with three All-Star selections and a Coach of the Year Award.

During the free agency period, the Sky made few changes to their roster from the previous year. The team traded away Astou Ndour and 2019 first-round pick Katie Lou Samuelson, acquired third-year player Azurá Stevens via trade, and signed veteran Sydney Colson. Free agents Allie Quigley, Courtney Vandersloot, and Stefanie Dolson were all re-signed to multi-year deals. Amid many All-Star players in the league changing teams, the Sky's decision to largely bring back the previous year's team received a grade of B− from SB Nation. On the other hand, women's basketball website Swish Appeal evaluated the Sky's decisions more positively and argued that the team positioned itself to contend for a championship. The WNBA-focused publication Winsidr gave the Sky a B+, rating the retentions of key players and addition of Sydney Colson highly, but criticizing the value of the trade for Stevens.

In the 2020 draft, the Sky selected Ruthy Hebard in the first round and Japreece Dean and Kiah Gillespie in the third round. The Sky received a grade of B in three post-draft evaluations from ESPN, CBS Sports, and SB Nation.

In March, the WNBA season was postponed due to the COVID-19 pandemic. Jantel Lavender will miss this season due to recovery from surgery on a broken foot, and Sydney Colson missed the beginning of the season due to recovery from COVID-19. Stefanie Dolson was also afflicted with COVID-19, but recovered before the start of the delayed season. On June 29, the Sky signed guard Stella Johnson.

The Sky returned to play for the shortened 22-game regular season at IMG Academy on July 26. Their first game was a rematch against the Las Vegas Aces, the team who had beaten them in the previous year's playoffs. Despite the Aces leading for most of the game, the Sky won 88-86. The Sky ended July with a 2–1 record. On August 1, they notched a narrow win against the Mystics, the last undefeated team in the league, and improved to 3–1. Over the next six games, the Sky alternated wins and losses and held a record of 6–4 after 10 games. During this stretch, on August 10, Courtney Vandersloot was named Eastern Conference Player of the Week. The Sky then won four consecutive games, including blowout wins against the Atlanta Dream and the New York Liberty, to improve to 10–4. Vandersloot was again named Eastern Conference Player of the Week following this run of games. However, they proceeded to lose the next two games against the lowest-seeded Liberty and the top-seeded Seattle Storm.

On August 28, the Sky traded two draft picks and Jantel Lavender, who had been out for the season due to injury, in exchange for Stephanie Mavunga. On August 29, two key players for the Sky, Diamond DeShields and Azurá Stevens, exited the IMG Academy bubble. Stevens left due to an injury that would require her to miss the remainder of the season and DeShields left for personal reasons. Both players had missed the previous two games due to injuries. On August 31, the Sky signed forward Alisia Jenkins to a seven-day contract.

On August 31, the Sky rebounded from their two-game losing streak with a win against the Indiana Fever. Courtney Vandersloot recorded 18 assists in the game, breaking the all-time WNBA record for assists in a single game (16) previously held by Ticha Penicheiro. Vandersloot's record-breaking 17th and 18th assists came in passes to her wife, Allie Quigley.

Game log

Regular season

|- style="background:#bbffbb"
| 1
| July 26
| Las Vegas Aces
| W 88-86
| Copper (26)
| Williams (7)
| Vandersloot (11)
| IMG AcademyNo In-Person Attendance
| 1–0
|- style="background:#bbffbb"
| 2
| July 28
| Los Angeles Sparks
| W 96-78
| Copper / Stevens (21)
| Copper (9)
| Vandersloot  (10)
| IMG AcademyNo In-Person Attendance
| 2–0
|- style="background:#ffcccc"
| 3
| July 30
| Minnesota Lynx
| L 81-83
| Parker / Stevens / Vandersloot (16)
| Stevens (11)
| DeShields (5)
| IMG AcademyNo In-Person Attendance
| 2-1

|- style="background:#bbffbb"
| 4
| August 1
| Washington Mystics
| W 88–86
| Copper / Williams (16)
| Williams (9)
| Vandersloot (8)
| IMG AcademyNo In-Person Attendance
| 3-1
|- style="background:#bbffbb"
| 5
| August 4
| Dallas Wings
| W 82-79
| Parker / Stevens / Quigley (15)
| Stevens (10)
| Vandersloot (10)
| IMG AcademyNo In-Person Attendance
| 4–1
|- style="background:#ffcccc"
| 6
| August 6
| Phoenix Mercury
| L 86–96
| Vandersloot (21)
| Parker (7)
| Vandersloot (8)
| IMG AcademyNo In-Person Attendance
| 4–2
|- style="background:#bbffbb"
| 7
| August 8
| Connecticut Sun
| W 100–93
| Quigley (22)
| Copper (7)
| Vandersloot (11)
| IMG AcademyNo In-Person Attendance
| 5–2
|- style="background:#ffcccc"
| 8
| August 10
| Seattle Storm
| L 71–89
| Quigley (13)
| Copper (6)
| Vandersloot (9)
| IMG AcademyNo In-Person Attendance
| 5–3
|- style="background:#bbffbb"
| 9
| August 12
| Phoenix Mercury
| W 89–71
| Quigley (20)
| Parker / Dolson (9)
| Vandersloot (5)
| IMG AcademyNo In-Person Attendance
| 6–3
|- style="background:#ffcccc"
| 10
| August 14
| Connecticut Sun
| L 74–77
| Parker (17)
| Stevens (8)
| Vandersloot (7)
| IMG AcademyNo In-Person Attendance
| 6–4
|- style="background:#bbffbb"
| 11
| August 16
| Atlanta Dream
| W 92–67
| Parker (17)
| Tied (6)
| Colson (6)
| IMG AcademyNo In-Person Attendance
| 7–4
|- style="background:#bbffbb"
| 12
| August 18
| Las Vegas Aces
| W 84–82
| Copper (18)
| Stevens (7)
| Vandersloot (15)
| IMG AcademyNo In-Person Attendance
| 8–4
|- style="background:#bbffbb"
| 13
| August 20
| New York Liberty
| W 101–85
| Stevens (25)
| Stevens (7)
| Vandersloot (10)
| IMG AcademyNo In-Person Attendance
| 9–4
|- style="background:#bbffbb"
| 14
| August 22
| Indiana Fever
| W 87–76
| Copper (26)
| Parker (8)
| Vandersloot (9)
| IMG AcademyNo In-Person Attendance
| 10–4
|- style="background:#ffcccc"
| 15
| August 25
| New York Liberty
| L 99–101
| Quigley (29)
| Williams (8)
| Vandersloot (9)
| IMG AcademyNo In-Person Attendance
| 10–5
|- style="background:#ffcccc"
| 16
| August 29
| Seattle Storm
| L 74–88
| Copper (19)
| Tied (6)
| Vandersloot (9)
| IMG AcademyNo In-Person Attendance
| 10–6
|- style="background:#bbffbb"
| 17
| August 31
| Indiana Fever
| W 100–77
| Tied (21)
| Hebard (11)
| Vandersloot (18)
| IMG AcademyNo In-Person Attendance
| 11–6

|- style="background:#ffcccc"
| 18
| September 2
| Minnesota Lynx
| L 83–86
| Quigley (23)
| Parker (15)
| Vandersloot (12)
| IMG AcademyNo In-Person Attendance
| 11–7
|- style="background:#ffcccc"
| 19
| September 4
| Washington Mystics
| L 69–79
| Parker (17)
| Copper (10)
| Vandersloot (11)
| IMG AcademyNo In-Person Attendance
| 11–8
|- style="background:#ffcccc"
| 20
| September 6
| Los Angeles Sparks
| L 80–86
| Parker (24)
| Parker (10)
| Vandersloot (15)
| IMG AcademyNo In-Person Attendance
| 11–9
|- style="background:#ffcccc"
| 21
| September 9
| Atlanta Dream
| L 89–97
| Vandersloot (22)
| Tied (7)
| Vandersloot (11)
| IMG AcademyNo In-Person Attendance
| 11–10
|- style="background:#bbffbb"
| 22
| September 11
| Dallas Wings
| W 95–88
| Parker (23)
| Hebard (8)
| Vandersloot (12)
| IMG AcademyNo In-Person Attendance
| 12–10

Playoffs 

|- style="background:#ffcccc"
| 1
| September 15
| Connecticut Sun
| L 81–94
| Quigley (19)
| Parker (8)
| Vandersloot (6)
| IMG Academy
| 0–1

Standings

Playoffs

Statistics

Regular season

Awards and honors

References

External links 

 Official website of the Chicago Sky

Chicago Sky
Chicago Sky seasons
Chicago Sky